Nearest and Dearest is a 1972 British comedy film starring Hylda Baker and Jimmy Jewel as feuding brother and sister Nellie and Eli Pledge, owners of "Pledge's Purer Pickles". A spin-off from the long running TV sitcom Nearest and Dearest, it was produced by Hammer Films in conjunction with a film making arm of Granada TV. As well as starring in the film, Hylda Baker also sings the title theme song. Despite the popularity of the TV series, the film version failed to match that success at the box office.

Plot
On their father's death, Eli and Nellie Pledge inherit a pickle factory in Colne, in the north of England. The warring siblings struggle to keep the decrepit "Pledge's Purer Pickles" afloat, hampered by severe lack of funds, zero business acumen and by having inherited a workforce that is a decade beyond retirement age. While Nellie works hard to keep the business going, Eli prefers to indulge in the delights of beer, cigarettes, gambling and women. The annual Summer holiday is soon upon them and the entire factory is closed down. Nellie takes Eli to a Blackpool boarding house run by landlady Mrs. Rowbottom, whose eyes light upon bachelor Eli. Eli though, only has eyes for the younger Freda. Eli's attempts to further his financial ambitions by marrying off Nellie to a colleague in the pickling business are challenged when Vernon Smallpiece is snatched from the altar by bailiffs for non-payment of his debts.

Cast
Hylda Baker as Nellie Pledge
Jimmy Jewel as Eli Pledge
Joe Gladwin as Stan
Edward Malin as Walter
Madge Hindle as Lily
Norman Mitchell as Vernon Smallpiece
Pat Ashton as Freda
Bert Palmer as Bert
Peter Madden as the court bailiff
Norman Chappell as a man on the bus
Yootha Joyce as Mrs Rowbottom
John Barrett as Joshua Pledge
Carmel Cryan as the Club hostess
Sue Hammer as Scarlet O'Hara
Janie Collinge as Vinegar Vera
Donald Bisset as Vicar
Kerry Jewel as Claude
Adele Warren as Mimi la Vere (stripper)
Nosher Powell as a bouncer

Critical reception
Sky Movies said, "a kind of bumper bundle of seaside postcard jokes, with acting honours going to Jimmy Jewel, underrated as a character actor, and Yootha Joyce, who pops up as Mrs Rowbottom."

References

External links

1972 comedy films
1972 films
Films based on television series
Hammer Film Productions films
British comedy films
1970s English-language films
1970s British films